This is a list of wineries in South Australia, arranged in alphabetical order by zone and region.

Barossa zone

Barossa Valley wine region

Eden Valley wine region

Fleurieu wine zone

McLaren Vale wine region
One Paddock Currency Creek Winery

Mount Lofty Ranges zone

Clare Valley wine region

See also

 Australian wine
 List of breweries in Australia
 South Australian wine

References

External links
South Australian Wine Industry Association – SA peak industry body official site

Wineries in South Australia